Dr. Dino Patti Djalal is a former Indonesian ambassador to the United States. He resigned from his ambassador post in September 2013 to pursue a presidential primary bid. He served as Indonesia's deputy foreign minister between July 2014 and October 2014.

He was succeeded by Budi Bowoleksono as ambassador to the United States.

Dino now heads up the Foreign Policy Community of Indonesia, a think tank to which he is officially credited as an advisor.

Early life
Dino Patti Djalal was born in Belgrade, Yugoslavia, on 10 September 1965, into an Indonesian diplomatic family. His father is Hajsim Djalal, a renowned Indonesian diplomat and former Indonesian deputy foreign minister.

Djalal completed his high school at McLean, Virginia, United States. Subsequently, he earned his bachelor's degree in political science at the Carleton University in Ottawa, Canada. He then went on to study at Simon Fraser University in Vancouver, Canada, where he was awarded a master's degree in political science. Djalal also obtained a Ph.D. in international relations from the London School of Economics and Political Science in London, United Kingdom.

References

Indonesian diplomats
Ambassadors of Indonesia to the United States
Living people
1965 births